The Thiruparankundram Dargah  is at the top of the Thiruparankundram hill in Tamil Nadu, India. It is a famous Islamic dargah (shrine), with the grave of Islamic saint Sultan Sikandhar Badushah shaheed.

History

Sulthan Sikandhar Badhusha Shaheed
Sikandhar Badusha, who was the governor of Jeddah, came along with Sulthan Syed Ibrahim Shaheed Badushah who came to Tamil Nadu in particular Ervadi from Madinah during the late 12th century.

Sikandhar Badhusha's rule in Madurai
Badusha Sulthan Syed Ibrahim shaheed Labswh of Erwadi won the Madurai province against the King Thiru Pandiyan who refused to convert to Islam and made Sulthan sikandhar Badusha the emperor of Madurai. King Tiru Pandiyan went to Tirupati, met all his friends and briefed them about the invasion of the Arabs. They helped him form a large troop.

War after Tirupandiyan's return
After forming a big and healthy troop to face the Arabs, King Thiruppandiyan started towards Madurai. The emperor, who was unaware about this turnaround, concentrated in spreading Islam and in the welfare of the people rather than strengthening the army. Tiruppandiyan's strong army fought with Sulthan Sikandhar Badhusha vigorously. Thousands of soldiers were killed on both sides.

The Arabs needed more troops to face the Pandiyas. Sulthan Sikandhar Badhusha sent nine of his soldiers to inform Sulthan Syed Ibrahim Shaheed the ruler of Bouthiramanikkapattinam (now Erwadi) to inform about the war and the need of more troops. Afraid of more soldiers arriving from Ervadi, King Thiruppandiyan sent a large number of his soldiers to stop the Arabian soldiers. Syed Salaar Sha Shaheed was killed at Palli chandai near Keeladi Silaiman and Syed Ibrahim Shaheed Razi at Karseri near Sakkimangalam. The remaining seven soldiers fought and continued their journey towards Ervadi. Again a large group of Pandiyan soldiers followed them up and a rigorous war held at Manamadurai in which five of the Arabian soldiers called as Khamsatu Shuhadaas (Anjanamaar - Paanch Peer) were killed.
The remaining two soldiers traveled hard to convey the message to the Emperor of Erwadi. Umar Khattab Shaheed was killed at Kilavaneri near Meesal. The only soldier alive was seriously injured by the Pandiyas.  He managed to reach Bouthiramanikkapattanam and conveyed the message of Thiuppandiyan's invasion back to Madurai. Sulthan Syed Ibrahim Badusha was saddened by this and sent a large troop towards Madurai. Before the troop could reach Madurai, the war came to an end and Thiruppandiyan recaptured the throne.

Martyrdom at Thiruparankundram hills

Sulthan Sikkandhar Badhusha Shaheed rested at Thiruparankundram caves for prayers and peace. Even after capturing the throne, King Thiruppandiyan suspected the resurgence of Sulthan Sikandhar Badusha and the Arabian forces. He searched for Sulthan Sikandhar badhusha shaheed. Thousands of soldiers were sent, and finally they could see a rock flying up and settling down regularly in the Thirupparagundram hill. When they followed that, they saw an Arabian horse which they confirmed to be of Sulthan Sikandhar badhusha. A few soldiers reached the cave where they found the rock to fly up while Sultan Sikandhar badhusha stood for prayers and settle down when he was prostrating. One of the mal'oon from the soldiers of Pandiya killed Sulthan Sikandhar Badhusha Shaheed during his prostration in prayers.

Miracles
Realising the sudden blindness to be the miracle (Karamat) of Sulthan Sikandhar badhusha, the assassin begged and lamented for forgiveness. Accepting their forgiveness, Mustajab Ad Dua Sikandhar Badhusha prayed and gave back his vision. As intended, they did the funeral of Holy Jasada Mubarak at the top of the hill as per Islamic regulations. A big rock flew and covered the Qabr of Sulthan sikandhar badusha.
There are other miracles (Karaamaat) of Sulthan Sikandhar badhusha happening day to day in the dargha and other the locations as believed by the visiting people.

Site of religious harmony today
Irrespective of religion, people from many parts of Tamil Nadu and from Kerala visit this durgah. People who visit the Ervadi Durgah in Ramanathapuram district are supposed to visit this durgah. 
Many poems are written in praise of Sultan Sikandhar Badhusha, by Syed Abdussalam Ibrahim Saalim Madurai Maqbara, the third in the list of Madurai Hazrats and his maternal grandson Syed Abdus Salaam Ibrahim Saahib. It is seen that people who come here with a wish see it answered in a very short time, and so he is called Mustajab ad Du'aa Sikandhar Badhushah. Mustajab Ad Du'aa in Arabic translates as "a saint whose prayers are immediately answered by Allah."

Urus Santhanakoodu Festival
The anniversary Urs festival of Sulthan Sikandar Badusha Shaheed is commemorated on the 17th night of the Islamic month of Rajab every Hijri year. Thousands of people visit the dargah at the hill top on this day. Arrangements are made by the dargah committee and the local police for the welfare of the pilgrims.

Town view from Dargah

See also
 Thiruparankundram

References

thiruparankundram

Thiruparankundram
Ziyarat
Mosques in Tamil Nadu
Mosques in Madurai
Tourist attractions in Madurai
Religious buildings and structures in Madurai
Dargahs in Tamil Nadu
Erwadi-related dargahs
Madurai district

bpy:থিরুপারানকুন্ডরাম
it:Thiruparankundram
ja:ティルッパランクンダム
pt:Thiruparankundram
ta:திருப்பரங்குன்றம் தர்காஹ்